Paul Kersey is the name of:

 Paul Kersey (character), the main character in the Death Wish film series
 Paul Kersey (drummer), Canadian drummer in the rock bands Max Webster and The Hunt
 Paul Kersey (actor) (born 1970), American actor in the film Hulk